Shrubhill Common is a 9.8 hectare Local Nature Reserve in Hemel Hempstead in Hertfordshire. It is owned and managed by Dacorum Borough Council. The site is common land, and it is part of the Chilterns Area of Outstanding Natural Beauty.

The common is woodland and scrub, together with two fields which are chalk grassland. In 2014 23 species of butterfly were recorded, including marbled whites. There are over 100 species of wild flowers, and herbs such as marjoram and basil.

There is access from Shrub Hill Road.

References

External links

Local Nature Reserves in Hertfordshire
Hemel Hempstead
Common land in England